Charlotte Pothuis (1 April 1867 – 24 January 1945) was a Dutch painter.

Biography
Pothuis was born on 1 April 1867 in London England.  She studied at the Dagtekenschool voor meisjes in Amersterdam. She also received instruction from Henriëtte Asscher, Meijer de Haan, Wilhelmina Cornelia Kerlen, Bartol Wilhelm van Laar, and Jan Zürcher. In 1891 she married fellow artist Karel Alexander August Jan Boom (1862-1943). She was a member of the Vereeniging Sint Lucas Amsterdam (Amsterdam Artists Association of Sint Lucas) and the Arti et Amicitiae artist's society. Pothuis' work was included in the 1939 exhibition and sale Onze Kunst van Heden (Our Art of Today) at the Rijksmuseum in Amsterdam.

In June 1896 she opened a photography studio with her colleague Anna Sluijter. They called their studio Dames Sluijter & Boom and it is considered one of the first woman-owned photography studios in Amsterdam. 
Pothuis died on 24 January 1945, in Amsterdam. Her work is in the Stedelijk Museum Amsterdam.

Gallery

References

External links

1867 births
1945 deaths
People from London
Dutch women painters
Dutch women photographers